The 1958 Wimbledon Championships took place on the outdoor grass courts at the All England Lawn Tennis and Croquet Club in Wimbledon, London, United Kingdom. The tournament was held from Monday 23 June until Saturday 5 July 1958. It was the 72nd staging of the Wimbledon Championships, and the third Grand Slam tennis event of 1958. Ashley Cooper and Althea Gibson won the singles titles.

Champions

Seniors

Men's singles

 Ashley Cooper defeated  Neale Fraser, 3–6, 6–3, 6–4, 13–11

Women's singles

 Althea Gibson defeated  Angela Mortimer, 8–6, 6–2

Men's doubles

 Sven Davidson /  Ulf Schmidt defeated  Ashley Cooper /  Neale Fraser, 6–4, 6–4, 8–6

Women's doubles

 Maria Bueno /  Althea Gibson defeated  Margaret duPont /   Margaret Varner, 6–3, 7–5

Mixed doubles

 Robert Howe /  Lorraine Coghlan defeated  Kurt Nielsen /  Althea Gibson, 6–3, 13–11

Juniors

Boys' singles

 Butch Buchholz defeated  Premjit Lall, 6–1, 6–3

Girls' singles

 Sally Moore defeated  Anna Dmitrieva, 6–2, 6–4

References

External links
 Official Wimbledon Championships website

 
Wimbledon Championships
Wimbledon Championships
Wimbledon Championships
Wimbledon Championships